Babita Deokaran was assassinated at around 08:00 SAST on 23 August 2021 while she was returning home from dropping her daughter off at school. A vehicle pulled alongside her vehicle and fired multiple shots after she had parked in front of her house in Johannesburg South, Gauteng Province, South Africa resulting in her death. The case caused significant controversy in South Africa given Deokaran's status as an anti-corruption whistleblower and the lack of protection afforded to her by the state. At the time of her death Deokaran was the acting chief financial officer at the Gauteng Provincial Government Department of Health.

Background

It was reported in the media that her death was linked to a corrupt COVID-19 PPE procurement scandal to the value of R332 million (equivalent to US$20 million) within the Gauteng Provincial Department of Health. An official from the South African Special Investigative Unit confirmed that Deokaran was a key witness in the investigation to expose a syndicate setup to benefit from state corruption. Deokaran had been on special leave for more than a year prior to her death whilst the investigation was underway.

Investigation
A neighbour informed the police that he had seen a suspicious BMW at the murder location multiple times before the event. This information enabled the authorities to trace the vehicle to a former member of the South African National Defence Force living in the Pretoria area and resulted in the arrest of six suspects. A passenger in Deokaran's vehicle at the time of the murder also provided important evidence leading to the arrests. The Sunday Times reported that Deokaran had been stalked and observed by her alleged assassins for more than a month prior to her death. The Sunday Times report also stated that CCTV cameras in the area had been mysteriously disabled just prior to the assassination whilst sophisticated surveillance software might have been used to monitor Deokaran's mobile phone and track her movements.

The six suspects were reported by the media to have been hired assassins with Cape Talk reporting that they were allegedly paid R2 million. News24 reported that the following suspects had been arrested Nhlanganiso Ndlovu, Siphakanyisa Dladla, Zitha Radebe, Simphiwe Mazibuko, Sanele Mbele, Phakamani Radebe; they also reported that more arrests were likely in the future. Due to water supply issues affecting the Johannesburg Magistrate's Court, the bail hearing was postponed to 30 November 2021.

Following Deokaran's death the chief executive of Tembisa Hospital and the provincial Department of Health chief finical officer were suspended.

Media coverage
Deokaran's murder received considerable attention in the media. The Daily Maverick published an editorial questioning why public officials received generous protection details whilst witnesses who blow the whistle on serious acts of corruption, like Deokaran, received no protection thereby raising questions about the South African government's commitment to fighting corruption in South Africa. Following her death South African president Cyril Ramaphosa stated that more state protection should be afforded to whistleblowers in the fight against corruption.

A New24 investigation concluded that African National Congress (ANC) Ekurhuleni treasurer-general Sello Sekhokho ran a number of businesses that were allegedly involved in corrupt dealings with the Gauteng Department of Health. News24 reported that Deokaran raised concerns over the nature of these dealings shortly before her assassination. Sekhokho denied the News24 allegations.

References 

Female murder victims
People murdered in South Africa
2021 murders in South Africa
August 2021 crimes in Africa
August 2021 events in South Africa
Murder in South Africa
Gauteng
South African whistleblowers
Corruption in South Africa
History of Johannesburg